Pedro Casella (31 October 1898 – 18 June 1971) was a Uruguayan footballer who played as a goalkeeper. He played all three matches for Uruguay at 1923 South American Championship. He was part of national team squads which defended South American Championship title in 1924 and won gold medal at 1924 Olympics, but didn't play any matches in both tournaments as Andrés Mazali was preferred as the starting goalkeeper.

Career statistics

International

References

External links
 

1898 births
1971 deaths
Uruguayan footballers
Uruguay international footballers
Footballers from Montevideo
Association football goalkeepers